Kyöpelinvuori (Finnish  from kyöpeli = obsolete word for ghost and vuori = mountain), in Finnish mythology, is the place which dead women haunt. It is rumoured that virgins who die young gather there after their death at the start of their afterlife. Similar stories of paradise mountains for pious virgins have also been known in Catholic Central Europe and Russia. It corresponds to Blockula (in modern Swedish Blåkulla) of Swedish mythology.

Kyöpelinvuori has been associated with witch-apathetic beliefs, but the name is not yet mentioned in documents dating back to the 17th-century witch hunts. In Swedish witch accounts, as mentioned before, the Sabbath was Blåkulla, which was sometimes spoken of in Finland as well, but more often only in general, a mountain or some other mythical place.

Kyöpelinvuori is also well known in Finland due to Easter: it is said to be the ancient home of mountain witches who fly on brooms with black cats. The witches leave the area only during Easter in order to spook children. These witches have also been humorously referred to be spinsters who will end up there in order to escape from the "old maid" tax..

According to the National Land Survey of Finland, there is a total number of 32 Kyöpelinvuori hills in Finland.

References 

Finnish mythology
Witchcraft in folklore and mythology
Protected areas of Finland